The palmate sea fan (Leptogorgia palma) is a species of gorgonian sea fan in the family Gorgoniidae.

Description
This fan grows up to 2 meters in total height and is bright red. It has small white polyps which retract into slits in the colony when not feeding. It has branches which fork from the central flattened trunk.

Distribution
This sea fan is found only around the South African coast from the Cape Peninsula to Sodwana in 10–100 m of water. It is endemic to this region.

Ecology
This fan is very slow-growing, at only 15mm per year, so large colonies may be more than 100 years old. It is eaten by a sponge crab (Pseudodromia latens), and a topshell snail (Calliostoma ornatum).

References 

Gorgoniidae
Cnidarians of the Indian Ocean
Endemic fauna of South Africa
Corals described in 1766
Taxa named by Peter Simon Pallas